Synek is Czech surname:

 Jana Synková, a Czechoslovak model-actress
 Jiří Synek, a Czech poet, prose writer, essayist
 Liane Synek (1922, Vienna - 1982), Austrian opera singer
 Ondřej Synek (born 1982, Brandýs nad Labem), a Czech rower

See also 
 Synekism

Czech-language surnames